Wednesday's Child is the sixth novel by Canadian detective fiction writer Peter Robinson in the Inspector Banks series. It was published in 1992, and reprinted a number of times since. It was the first of Robinson's novels to be shortlisted for the Edgar Award.

External links
Dedicated page on author's website

1992 Canadian novels
Novels by Peter Robinson (novelist)
Novels set in Yorkshire
Viking Press books